Glycomyces lacisalsi is a Gram-positive and aerobic bacterium from the genus of Glycomyces.

References

External links
Type strain of Glycomyces lacisalsi at BacDive -  the Bacterial Diversity Metadatabase

Actinomycetia
Bacteria described in 2016